Fredricks is a surname. Notable people with the surname include:

 Charles D. Fredricks (1823–1894), American photographer
 Edgar Fredricks (1942–2016), American politician
 Paul Fredricks (1918–2010), German-American brass musician
 Richard Fredricks (born 1933), American opera singer
 Tucker Fredricks (born 1984), American speed skater